The 39th Filmfare Awards were held in 1994.

Khalnayak led the ceremony with 11 nominations, followed by Baazigar and Darr with 10 nominations each.

Baazigar and Damini were the most awarded films with 4 awards each, with the former winning Best Actor (for Shah Rukh Khan), and the latter winning Best Director (for Rajkumar Santoshi) and Best Supporting Actor (for Sunny Deol).

Shah Rukh Khan won his first Best Actor award for his performance in Baazigar. He also won his first Best Actor (Critics) award for Kabhi Haan Kabhi Naa, and was nominated for Best Villain for his performance in Yash Chopra's Darr, rounding off a spectacular year for him.

Juhi Chawla received won the Best Actress award for her performance in Hum Hain Rahi Pyar Ke, her first and only win in the category.

Main awards

Best Film
 Hum Hain Rahi Pyaar Ke 
Aankhen
Baazigar
Damini
Darr
Khalnayak

Best Director
 Rajkumar Santoshi – Damini 
David Dhawan – Aankhen
Mahesh Bhatt – Hum Hain Rahi Pyaar Ke
Subhash Ghai – Khalnayak
Yash Chopra – Darr

Best Actor
 Shah Rukh Khan – Baazigar 
Aamir Khan – Hum Hain Rahi Pyar Ke
Govinda – Aankhen
Jackie Shroff – Gardish
Sanjay Dutt – Khalnayak

Best Actress
 Juhi Chawla – Hum Hain Rahi Pyaar Ke 
Dimple Kapadia – Rudaali
Madhuri Dixit – Khalnayak
Meenakshi Sheshadri – Damini
Sridevi – Gumrah

Best Supporting Actor
 Sunny Deol – Damini 
Amrish Puri – Gardish
Jackie Shroff – Khalnayak
Nana Patekar – Tirangaa
Naseeruddin Shah – Sir

Best Supporting Actress
 Amrita Singh – Aaina 
Anu Aggarwal – Khal-Naaikaa
Dimple Kapadia – Gardish
Raakhee – Anari
Shilpa Shetty – Baazigar

Best Comedian
 Anupam Kher – Darr 
Anupam Kher – Shreemaan Aashique
Johnny Lever – Baazigar
Kader Khan – Aankhen

Best Villain
 Paresh Rawal – Sir 
Amrish Puri – Damini
Gulshan Grover – Sir
Raj Babbar – Dalaal
Shah Rukh Khan – Darr

Best Debut
 Saif Ali Khan – Aashiq Awara

Lux New Face of the Year
 Mamta Kulkarni – Aashiq Awara

Best Story
 Damini – Sutanu Gupta

Best Screenplay
 Baazigar – Akash Khurana, Robin Bhatt and Javed Siddiqui

Best Dialogue
 Sir – Jay Dixit

Best Music Director 
 Baazigar – Anu Malik 
Darr – Shiv-Hari
Hum Hain Rahi Pyaar Ke – Nadeem-Shravan
Khalnayak – Laxmikant–Pyarelal
Rudaali – Bhupen Hazarika

Best Lyricist
 Hum Hain Rahi Pyaar Ke – Sameer for Ghunghat Ki Aad Se 
Baazigar – Dev Kohli for Yeh Kaali Kaali Aankhen
Darr – Anand Bakshi for Jaadu Teri Nazar
Khalnayak – Anand Bakshi for Choli Ke Peeche
Rudaali – Gulzar for Dil Hum Hum

Best Playback Singer, Male
 Baazigar – Kumar Sanu for Yeh Kaali Kaali Aankhen  
Anari – Udit Narayan for Phoolon Sa Chehra Tera
Baazigar – Kumar Sanu for Baazigar O Baazigar
Darr – Udit Narayan for Jaadu Teri Nazar
Khalnayak – Vinod Rathod for Nayak Nahin

Best Playback Singer, Female
 Khalnayak – Alka Yagnik and Ila Arun for Choli Ke Peeche 
Baazigar – Alka Yagnik for Baazigar O Baazigar
Hum Hain Rahi Pyaar Ke – Alka Yagnik for Hum Hain Rahi Pyaar Ke
Khalnayak – Alka Yagnik for Paalki Pe Ho Ke Sawaar

Best Action
 Gardish

Best Art Direction
 Gardish

Best Choreography
 Khalnayak – Saroj Khan for Choli Ke Peeche

Best Cinematography
 Darr

Best Editing
 Gardish

Best Sound
 Damini

Lifetime Achievement Award
 Dilip Kumar and Lata Mangeshkar

Critics' awards

Best Film
 Kabhi Haan Kabhi Naa

Best Actor
 Shah Rukh Khan – Kabhi Haan Kabhi Naa

Best Documentary
 I Live in Behrampada

Biggest Winners
Baazigar – 4/10
Damini – 4/7
Hum Hain Rahi Pyaar Ke – 3/7
Gardish – 3/6
Sir – 2/4
Darr – 2/10
Khalnayak – 2/11

References

 https://www.imdb.com/event/ev0000245/1994/

See also
 40th Filmfare Awards
 41st Filmfare Awards
 Filmfare Awards

Filmfare Awards
Filmfare